The 2014 Tour of Austria was the 66th edition of the Tour of Austria, an annual bicycle race. Departing from Tulln on July 6, concluded in Vienna on July 13.

Schedule

Teams
19 teams were invited to participate in the tour: 10 UCI ProTeams, 3 UCI Professional Continental Teams and 6 UCI Continental Teams.

Stages

Stage 1
6 July 2014 – Tulln to Sonntagberg,

Stage 2
7 July 2014 – Waidhofen an der Ybbs to Bad Ischl,

Stage 3
8 July 2014 – Bad Ischl to Kitzbüheler Horn,

Stage 4
9 July 2014 – Kitzbühel to Matrei in Osttirol,

Stage 5
10 July 2014 – Matrei in Osttirol to Sankt Johann im Pongau,

Stage 6
11 July 2014 – Sankt Johann im Pongau to Villach,

Stage 7
12 July 2014 – Podersdorf am See to Podersdorf am See, individual time trial (ITT)

Stage 8
13 July 2014 – Podersdorf am See to Vienna,

Classification leadership

Standings

General classification

Points classification

Mountains classification

Young rider classification

Team classification

References

External links
Tour of Austria homepage

Tour of Austria
Tour of Austria
Tour of Austria